Malee is a 2011 Sri Lankan mystery thriller teledrama broadcast on TV Derana. The series is produced by Janaka Siriwardena and directed by Nimal Ratnayake. It initially aired from every Monday to Thursday from 7.30 pm to 8 pm onwards but later changed to air on every weekday at 9 pm to 9.30 pm. The series was followed by three more seasons - Aththamma (Malee 2), Sidu (Malee 3) and Shakthi (Sidu 2).

It stars Duleeka Marapana in lead role along with newcomer actors Samadhi Arunachaya and Sanketh Wickremage in supportive roles. The show becomes highly popular and was nominated for Sumathi Awards and Raigam Tele'es in many award categories.

Seasons

Plot
Malee, who has wizarding powers which cures people practices Ayurvedic from her mother, Dingiri who is a Ayurvedic doctor in a rural village , Mudunagala. Nirmal, the divisional secretary in Mudunagala, is bitten by a snake. Malee removes poisons in Nirmal's leg and brings him to her home for treatment. Dingiri cures him and Malee befriends with Nirmal. She receives a marriage proposal from Kusumsiri.

Dingiri's cousin, Ukkuwa is a witchcraft practiced man. He uses his wizarding powers for bad things. Unable to defeat Dingiri, Ukkuwa hates her and tries to stop the birth of grandson to Dingiri's family because he knew that, if Dingiri had a grandson he must be powerful beyond all. To stop Malee's marriage, Ukkuwa kills Kusumsiri.

Eventually, Nirmal and Malee fall for each other and get married. Ukkuwa's son, Nandipala comes to Mudunagala and starts learning palmistry. Soon, Malee gets pregnant and suffers from an excessive abdominal pain. Nirmal informs it to Dingiri, who checks Malee and realizes that Ukkuwa is trying to kill their unborn child. To save child's life, Dingiri decides to separate the baby from Malee and Nirmal for 21 years after birth. Nirmal and Malee are shocked on learning that and Dingiri advices them to keep away from village. Dingiri informs this to her close friend Yasa and her daughter Muthu, who is Malee's friend. Then, Muthu pretends as pregnant infornt of villagers on Dingiri's guidance.

However, Malee delivers a baby girl and Dingiri informs them to come to Jaya Sri Maha Bodhi with baby. Next Day, They come with baby while Muthu is also come with Dingiri. Dingiri takes the baby from Malee and gives Muthu to take care. Malee and Nirmal bid an emotional farewell to them and move to England.

Cast and characters

Main cast
 Duleeka Marapana as Dingiri Mudunagala – An ayurvedic doctor; Malee and Shakti's mother 
 Samadhi Arunachaya as Malee Bandara – Dingiri's daughter, Shakti's sister, Nirmal's wife 
 Sanketh Wickramage as Nirmal Bandara – Navaratne and Geeta's son, Malee's husband 
 Sarath Chandrasiri as Ukkuwa – Dingiri and Malee's foe, Nandipala's father
 Gamini Hettiarachchi as Navaratne Bandara – Nirmal's father

Supportive cast
 Sarath Karunarathne as Kusumsiri – Malee's former fiancé (Dead)
 Ananda Wickramage as Rajaratne
 Shashika Peiris as Muthu – Malee's friend, Suranga's wife
 Kokila Pawan as Shakti Mudunagala – Dingiri's son; Malee's brother 
 Jayantha Muthuthanthri as Nandipala – Ukkuwa's son
 Hashinika Karaliyadde as Nandipala's wife
 Princy Fernando as Siri – Ukkuwa's helper
 Ajith Lokuge as Village councilor
 Nimal Yatiwella as Councilor's friend
 Sathyajith Wedisinghe as Minister
 Niluka Rekhani as Vajira – Minister's wife
 Janaka Kumbukage as Saliya – Madhrangi's father
 Sandhani Sulakna as Madhurangi – Nirmal's friend who worked as a journalist
 Rohani Weerainghe as Chitrangani – Madhurangi's mother
 Isuru Lokuhettiarachchi as Piyaratne 
 Malkanthi Jayasinghe
 Shan Bandu Weerasinghe

References

External links
 Malee episodes

Sri Lankan television shows
TV Derana original programming